Louis Norman "Bobo" Newsom (August 11, 1907 – December 7, 1962) was an American starting pitcher in Major League Baseball. Also known as "Buck", Newsom played for nine of the 16 then-existing big-league teams from 1929 through 1953 over all or parts of 20 seasons, appearing in an even 600 games pitched and 3,759 innings pitched.

Life and career

Born in Hartsville, South Carolina, Newsom was known to possess a somewhat eccentric and emotional personality, typically referring to everyone in the third person, including referring to himself as "Bobo".

He was traded along with Red Kress and Buster Mills from the Red Sox to the Browns for Joe Vosmik on December 3, 1937.

Newsom pitched valiantly in a losing cause in Game Seven of the 1940 World Series with the Detroit Tigers, two days after pitching a shutout in honor of his father, who had died while visiting from South Carolina and watching his son win the opener. Bobo had said before pitching Game Five, "I'll win this one for my daddy." When manager Del Baker named Newsom to take the mound for Game Seven, Bobo was asked by reporters, "will you win this one for your daddy too?" "Why, no", Newsom said, "I think I'll win this one for old Bobo."

Newsom's performance in 1941 was a disappointment, as he lost 20 games, winning only 12. When Tigers' general manager Jack Zeller negotiated a contract with Newsom, he said, "You'll have to take a salary cut, Newsom, since you lost 20 games last season." The plain-spoken Bobo, remembering what Commissioner Kenesaw Mountain Landis had done to release players on minor-league teams that were under major-league teams' control, snapped, "Hell, you lost ninety-one of Briggs' [the team owner] ball players last year, and I don't see you taking no cut." Zeller was not amused and traded Newsom to the Washington Senators.
 
Although Newsom pitched poorly in Game 3, allowing five runs in less than two innings, he garnered a Series ring while with the New York Yankees in 1947.

In a 20-season career, Newsom posted a 211–222 record with 2082 strikeouts and a 3.98 ERA in 3759 innings pitched. He also made the American League All-Star team from 1938–1940 and in 1944. With 211 wins, he is one of the 100 winningest pitchers of all time. His 222 losses also make him one of only two major league pitchers to win 200 games and still have a sub .500 career winning percentage, the other being Jack Powell. Upon his retirement in 1953, he was the last major leaguer to have played in the 1920s to still be active. Newsom is one of only 29 players in baseball history to date to have appeared in Major League games in four decades.

Al Benton is the only major-league pitcher to have faced both Babe Ruth and Mickey Mantle. Newsom was the only other pitcher whose career spanned that of both hitters. He did face Ruth in 1934; however, in 1951, Mantle's first year, Newsom was out of the majors, and in 1952, Newsom never faced the Yankees—and the one time he faced them in 1953, Mantle was out of the lineup with an injury.

Newsom died in Orlando, Florida at age 55 from cirrhosis of the liver and was buried at Magnolia Cemetery in his home town of Hartsville, which also has a street named in his honor.

Newsom is mentioned in the 1949 poem "Line-Up for Yesterday" by Ogden Nash, where he is the only player mentioned still not in the Hall of Fame as of 2021:

See also

Best pitching seasons by a Detroit Tiger
 List of Major League Baseball career wins leaders
 List of Major League Baseball players who played in four decades
 List of Major League Baseball annual strikeout leaders
 List of Major League Baseball career strikeout leaders
 Major League Baseball titles leaders

Books
Bobo Newsom, Baseball's Traveling Man by Jim McConnell (McFarland & Company, Jefferson, North Carolina, 2016)

References

External links

Bobo Newsom
The Deadball Era

1907 births
1962 deaths
Albany Senators players
American League All-Stars
American League strikeout champions
Baseball players from South Carolina
Birmingham Barons players
Boston Red Sox players
Brooklyn Dodgers players
Brooklyn Robins players
Burials in South Carolina
Chattanooga Lookouts players
Chicago Cubs players
Alcohol-related deaths in Florida
Detroit Tigers players
Greenville Tobacconists players
Jersey City Skeeters players
Little Rock Travelers players
Los Angeles Angels (minor league) players
Macon Peaches players
Major League Baseball pitchers
New York Giants (NL) players
New York Yankees players
Pacific Coast League MVP award winners
People from Hartsville, South Carolina
Philadelphia Athletics players
Raleigh Capitals players
Reading Keystones players
St. Louis Browns players
Washington Senators (1901–1960) players